Nude is the eighth studio album and a concept album released by the English progressive rock band Camel in January 1981. The album is based on a true story of a Japanese soldier (Hiroo Onoda) marooned on an island in World War II who doesn't know that the war is over. 'Nude' derives from his family name 'Onoda'. Most of the album is composed of instrumentals with only a few tracks containing lyrics. The album's lyrics were mainly written by Susan Hoover, except "Please Come Home", which was written by Andrew Latimer. It was the last Camel album to feature original drummer Andy Ward, and the last Camel album to feature more than one original member.

Synopsis

Within the album, a story is displayed to tell about the album's plot. The concept mainly focuses on the theme of Onoda's isolation from the rest of the world and the effects on the way he lives after his disappearance and discovery.

The year is 1942 and World War II is in full motion. Hiroo Onoda has found himself living in a society ruled over by harsh regulations and orders that have altered the way that both himself and the rest of Imperial Japan have to live through everyday ("City Life/ Nude"). One day, Nude receives an envelope in the mail that require his services to the Japanese Army and the war effort. Seeing that he had no other options, he follows the instructions ("Drafted"). When the time had finally arrived, Nude finds himself alongside other young soldiers who are being loaded onto a ship to head for battle with a crowd of people watching behind them ("Docks"). Eventually, he is thrown into the fighting on a Pacific Island and is quickly overwhelmed by his surroundings, leading to a blackout during combat ("Beached"). When Nude wakes up, he is alone and without his regiment. He drifts off to sleep with the hopes that he will soon be rescued by his Unit, unaware of the fact that he has been left behind, all alone on the war torn island ("Landscapes").

Time passes and many lonely years drift by. By now, Nude has given up his search and is currently living in a cave beside a lagoon, constantly patrolling through the jungles for any hiding enemies ("Changing Places"). Every once in a while, he retreats to a high mountaintop and runs through a procedure that fulfills his military duties, including reciting his countries national anthem and firing a bullet into the sky ("Pomp & Circumstance"). When a plane flies over him one day, Nude is greeted by a large content of leaflets, letters and photographs urging him to accept the end of the war and for him to return to his country ("Please Come Home"), however, he dismisses these replies, assuming that the Allied Forces were playing tricks on him. Over time, Nude feels a shift in his feelings and comes to the conclusion that the war had truly ended long ago ("Reflections"). While on a hunt somewhere later on, he is captured and thrown onto a boat taking him back to Japan ("Captured").

Upon hearing of his return, the entire nation rejoiced. When Nude had landed back in his home land, he is greeted with crowds of people in celebration and excitement for his return ("The Homecoming"). Despite the warm welcome, his years of loneliness and lack of communication leads to a breakdown; a tidal wave of publicity that he did not favor ("Lies"). With the passing of his fame came his separation from the rest of society and life became dull for the returned soldier, even with his fame and government rewards. On his 50th Birthday, a small group had thrown a party for him and gave him a cake that allowed him to remember his time away. Nude is moved by such a presentation and is allowed to be left alone to reflect on his past ("The Last Farewell: The Birthday Cake/ Nudes Return").

Track listing

2009 Expanded & Remastered Edition

Bonus tracks recorded at Hammersmith Odeon on 22 February 1981 for BBC Radio One "In Concert". Excerpts from "Nude" medley:

Personnel
Camel
 Andrew Latimer – guitars, vocals, flute, koto & various keyboards; lead vocals on "Please Come Home" and "Lies"
 Colin Bass – bass, vocals; lead vocals on "City Life" and "Drafted"
 Andy Ward – drums, percussion

Additional musicians
 Mel Collins – flute, piccolo, saxophones
 Duncan Mackay – keyboards
 Jan Schelhaas – piano on "The Last Farewell"
 Chris Green – cello on "Drafted"
 Gasper Lawal – all percussion on "Changing Places"
 Herbie Flowers – tuba on "The Homecoming"

Production
 Engineered by Tony Clarke
 Cover design by Mayblin/Shaw/Munday

Charts

References

External links
  [Dead Link]
 [Archive of dead link:]
 
 Camel - Nude (1981) album review by Daevid Jehnzen, credits & releases at AllMusic.com
 Camel - Nude (1981) album releases & credits at Discogs.com
 Camel - Nude (1981) album review by Archibald C. Burke, credits & user reviews at SputnikMusic.com
 Camel - Nude (1981) album to be listened as stream at Play.Spotify.com

1981 albums
Camel (band) albums
Concept albums
Decca Records albums